Helen Clark MacInnes (October 7, 1907 – September 30, 1985) was a Scottish-American writer of espionage novels.

Life
She and her husband emigrated to the United States in 1937, when he took an academic position at Columbia University in New York, while retaining his role in the British MI6, for foreign espionage. MacInnes published her first novel during World War II, and her early novels are all based in that setting. Later she wrote more about characters within the context of the Cold War.

Early life
Helen Clark MacInnes was born on October 7, 1907 in Glasgow to Donald MacInnes and Jessica McDiarmid, and had a traditional Scots Presbyterian upbringing. MacInnes graduated from the University of Glasgow in Scotland in 1928 with an MA in French and German. MacInnes continued her studies at University College, London, where she received a diploma in librarianship in 1931.

While working as a librarian, MacInnes met the classics scholar Gilbert Highet.  The pair married on September 22, 1932, and moved to New York City in 1937.  The pair had one child, Keith Highet, who was born in 1933 and became an eminent international lawyer.

Career
In the early 1930s, MacInnes had collaborated with Highet to translate German literature, which helped finance their summer travels through Europe. These European excursions gave MacInnes exposure to locations that she used later as settings for her espionage thrillers.

MacInnes accepted an appointment as a special cataloguer for the Ferguson Collection at the University of Glasgow. She worked with the Dunbartonshire Education Authority to select books for county libraries. In 1932, Gilbert Highet accepted a classics teaching appointment at St John's College, Oxford. While in Oxford, MacInnes performed as an amateur actress with the Oxford University Dramatic Society and the Oxford Experimental Theatre.

One of MacInnes’ greatest inspirations in writing on foreign affairs and espionage was her honeymoon to the European mainland, Bavaria in particular. As she and Highet witnessed the oppression of the German totalitarian regime, she swore to write against the oppressive forces of the Nazi government. MacInnes even kept notes about the different governments she saw in her travels with Highet that she would refer back to when she began writing full-time.

Highet served as a British intelligence agent in MI6 in addition to working as a classical scholar. Highet continued his work with MI6 after he and MacInnes moved to the U.S. in 1937. That year he accepted an appointment as a professor and chairman of the department of classics (Latin and Greek) at Columbia University in New York City.   When the couple moved there permanently, MacInnes began her writing career. Highet's work in intelligence, in addition to MacInnes's own research and traveling, influenced her writing. MacInnes and Highet produced two books together, translations of German works.

In 1939, the couple's son was taken to hospital with a ruptured appendix. During this episode, Highet came across MacInnes's notes and commentary on Hitler's rise to power, and other matters of contemporary politics. He encouraged her to use them as the basis for a novel.

During the following 45 years, MacInnes wrote 21 espionage thrillers, four of which were later adapted as  films. Her early books were set during the Second World War, often featuring lay people who become spies or otherwise caught up in acting on behalf of the Allied war effort. MacInnes became a U.S. citizen in 1952.

MacInnes’ first novel, Above Suspicion, was published in 1941 and remains one of her most famous works. The plot was loosely tied to her travels with Highet and his work in particular with MI6. It follows the journey of newlywed English couple Frances and Richard Myles overseas as they are charged with going “above the suspicion” of the Nazi regime to seek out an undercover spy living in Austria to determine if his position as informant and his information is still valid. It was adapted into a film in 1943 by MGM director Richard Thorpe, and was promoted with the tagline “It happened on a honeymoon,” a parallel between MacInnes and Highet and the Myles couple. MacInnes's second novel, Assignment in Brittany (1942), was made required reading for Allied intelligence agents who were being sent to work with the French resistance against the Nazis.  It was featured on the New York Times first fiction bestseller list, in 1942. Her 1944 book, The Unconquerable, gives such an accurate portrayal of the Polish resistance that some reviewers and readers thought she was using classified information given to her by her husband.

In her later books, MacInnes shifted her subject matter from World War II to the Cold War. The Venetian Affair, for example, was published in 1963, and set in Paris and Venice; it involved Soviet agents and sleeper cells, alluded to events unfolding in Algeria and Vietnam, and contained a conspiracy to assassinate Charles de Gaulle.  She continued to produce about one book every two years until her final novel Ride a Pale Horse (1984).

MacInnes’ career was not dotted with many awards, although she did win the 1966 Iona University Columbia Prize for Literature. This is most directly related to her influence in the state of New York, seeing as her first sixteen novels (those written up to 1966) each spent time on the international best sellers’ list (according to a 1974 People Magazine article).

A review in The New York Times praised MacInnes' body of work for its  "unfailing eye for vivid backgrounds, her deft control of complex story lines, and her clear-cut presentation of each important member of her casts. These common qualities have given her work a kind of grandeur, a romantic overtone suggesting knights in mortal combat." Many of MacInnes’ novels are continuing to be renewed for print, cementing her legacy as one of the trailblazing female international affairs novelists in the World War II and Cold War eras.

Her husband Gilbert Highet died in 1978.  MacInnes died in New York City on September 30, 1985 at age 77, following a stroke she had suffered three weeks earlier.

MacInnes's writing reflects an affinity for Arthur Koestler and Rebecca West, as she strongly opposed any form of tyranny and totalitarianism.

Works

Above Suspicion (1941), made into a film of the same title
Assignment in Brittany (1942) made into a film of the same title (though both novel and film are sometimes referred to as  Cross Channel, the title of the novel in its serialized form)
The Unconquerable (1944), also called While Still We Live
Horizon (1945)
Friends and Lovers (1947)
Rest and Be Thankful (1949)
Neither Five Nor Three (1951)
I and My True Love (1953)
Pray for a Brave Heart (1955)
North from Rome (1958)
Decision at Delphi (1960)
The Venetian Affair (1963), made into a film of the same title
Home Is the Hunter (1964), subtitle: A Comedy in Two Acts
The Double Image (1966)
The Salzburg Connection (1968), made into a film of the same title
Message from Málaga (1971)
The Snare of the Hunter (1974)
Agent in Place (1976)
Prelude to Terror (1978)
The Hidden Target (1980)
Cloak of Darkness (1982)
Ride a Pale Horse (1984)

Helen MacInnes' backlist fiction titles have been republished by Titan Books.

Translator

Translated Sexual Life in Ancient Rome, together with Gilbert Highet 1934, from the work of Otto Kiefer, Routledge, 1934.
Translated Friedrich Engels: A Biography, together with Gilbert Highet 1939, from the work of Gustav Meyer, Chapman and Hall, 1934.

References

Further reading
Scholarly studies
Ball, Robert J. "Correspondence of Gilbert Highet and Helen MacInnes with Classical Scholars and Other Individuals." Classical World 101, no. 4 (2008): 504-532.
Boyd, Mary K. "The Enduring Appeal of the Spy Thrillers of Helen MacInnes." Clues: A Journal of Detection 4 (1983): 66-75.
Carter, Thomas D. Enemies Within and Without: Foreign and Domestic Affairs in the Spy Thriller Novels of Helen MacInnes, Dorothy Gilman, and Robert Ludlum, 1940-1990. PhD diss., Middle Tennessee State University, 2003.
Lassner, Phyllis. "Double Trouble: Helen MacInnes’s and Agatha Christie’s Speculative Spy Thrillers." In The History of British Women’s Writing, 1945–1975, pp. 227–241. Palgrave Macmillan, London, 2017.
Lassner, Phyllis. Espionage and Exile: Fascism and Anti-Fascism in British Spy Fiction and Film. Edinburgh University Press, 2016.
Lassner, Phyllis. "Under Suspicion: The Plotting of Britain in World War II Detective Spy Fiction." Intermodernism: Literary Culture in Mid-Twentieth-Century Britain (2011): 113-130.
Matthews, Nicole. "Reading and the visual dimensions of the book: The popular Cold War Fictions of Helen Macinnes." In Reading in History: New methodologies from the Anglo-American tradition, pp. 63–76. Taylor & Francis, 2010.
Publishers Weekly editors. "Helen MacInnes". The Author Speaks, 512-413. New York: R.R. Bowker.

External links
 

1907 births
1985 deaths
Alumni of the University of Glasgow
Alumni of University College London
American librarians
American women librarians
American women novelists
Writers from Glasgow
Scottish librarians
Scottish women novelists
British emigrants to the United States
20th-century American novelists
Scottish novelists
20th-century American women writers
British women librarians